Reference Island is one of the uninhabited Canadian arctic islands in Kivalliq Region, Nunavut, Canada. It is located within Chesterfield Inlet.

References

Islands of Chesterfield Inlet
Uninhabited islands of Kivalliq Region